Creise is a mountain summit in the Black Mount range, in the Scottish Highlands. Creise is one of four Munros in the Black Mount, along with Meall a' Bhuiridh, Stob Ghabhar and Stob a' Choire Odhair. The mountain is a long and flattish ridge, whose highest point was unnamed until 1981. It is popular with cross-country skiers, being near the White Corries ski area from where it is often climbed along with adjoining Meall a' Bhuiridh. The steep and craggy northern buttress, Sròn na Crèise, is well seen from the A82 road road and the Kings House Hotel.

Name
The mountain is a long and flattish ridge. Until 1981, it seems the only named parts of the ridge were Sròn na Crèise and Stob a' Ghlais Choire at the northern end, and Clach Leathad (Clachlet) at the southern end. The highest point was apparently unnamed until then, being only one meter higher than Clach Leathad. It seems that the whole ridge was called by the plural Na Crèisean. The meaning is unclear. Irvine Butterfield says that crèis, meaning 'grease' or 'fat', refers to the rich grazing land around the mountain which was used in the past by Glen Coe herdsman to fatten their cattle.

Landscape 
Creise is a long whaleback of a mountain, oriented north to south. It has a three kilometre long summit ridge with four distinct high points. The most southerly is Clach Leathad (Clachlet) which with a height of 1099 metres is just a metre lower than the main summit. Up to the 1970s it was regarded as the highest point of the mountain.  It was downgraded to a "Munro Top" in the 1981 edition of Munro's Tables. North of Clach Leathad along the ridge is Mam Coire Easain (1070 metres), a former "Munro Top" deleted from the tables in 1981. It stands at the head of the ridge linking the mountain to Meall a' Bhuiridh. The main summit stands a further north. It was previously an unnamed Munro Top on OS maps before being promoted to Munro in 1981.

A fourth high point is Stob a' Ghlais Choire (996 metres). This Munro Top stands at the northern end of the ridge above the crags of Sròn na Crèise which fall steeply to the valley of the River Etive. Sròn na Creise offers a challenging scrambler's route to the summit, but needs care in winter as several serious accidents have occurred on the crags. 

Rainfall on Creise finds its way to both coasts of Scotland.  Drainage from the south of the mountain (Clach Leathad) flows into Coire Ba, one of the biggest corries in Scotland, and arrives at the east coast at the Firth of Tay via the Rivers Ba, Tummel and Tay. All other drainage from the mountain is via Glen Etive and Loch Etive to the west coast near Oban.

Climbing 
The most popular ascent of Creise along with the neighbouring Meall a' Bhuiridh starts at the White Corries ski Centre (grid reference ) and climbs Meall a' Bhuiridh first by following the line of the ski chair lift (no self-respecting mountaineer would use the lift). The lifts and tows go right up to the summit of the mountain. The continuation to Creise goes SW and then west over a col with a height of 932 metres which connects the two mountains to reach the summit plateau of Creise. A direct ascent from the same starting point goes west across moorland to reach the foot of Sròn na Creise, it is then a scramblers route up to the northern end of the summit ridge. The hill can also be climbed as part of the Clachlet Traverse, a 25 km classic walk between the Inveroran Inn at Bridge of Orchy and the Kings House Inn in Glen Coe taking all four of the Black Mount Munros with 1700 metres of ascent. The view from the summit takes in a close up of the cliffs of Buachaille Etive Mòr and the western part of Rannoch Moor

References 

 The Munros, Donald Bennett et al.: Scottish Mountaineering Trust: 
 Hamish’s Mountain Walk, Hamish Brown, 
 The High Mountains of Britain and Ireland, Irvine Butterfield, 
 The Magic Of The Munros, Irvine Butterfield, 
 The Munros, Britains Highest Mountains, Cameron McNeish, 
Footnotes

Munros
Marilyns of Scotland
Mountains and hills of the Southern Highlands
Mountains and hills of Highland (council area)
One-thousanders of Scotland